The Castle in Flanders is a 1936 German drama film directed by Géza von Bolváry and starring Mártha Eggerth, Paul Hartmann, and Georg Alexander. It was shot at the Johannisthal Studios in Berlin. The film's sets were designed by the art directors Emil Hasler and Arthur Schwarz.

Cast

Reception
Writing for Night and Day in 1937, Graham Greene gave the film a mixed review. Greene noted that the film's depictions of England and English culture were rather off the mark, but despite this he claimed that "th[e] picture has merits" and that "there are excellent scenes" which he identified as the scenes in Ypres after the war had ended and Gloria Delamare (Eggerth) attempts to book a hotel room only to be moved by a porter to the neighboring castle. Greene points to the return of Fred Winsbury (Hartmann) as the point in the film where the audience loses interest and the film loses reality.

References

Bibliography

External links 
 

1936 films
1936 drama films
German drama films
Films of Nazi Germany
1930s German-language films
Films directed by Géza von Bolváry
Tobis Film films
German black-and-white films
Films shot at Johannisthal Studios
1930s German films